Barú is a district of the Pérez Zeledón canton, in the San José province of Costa Rica.

History 
Barú was created on 3 November 1983 by Acuerdo Ejecutivo 232. Segregated from San Isidro de El General.

Geography 
Barú has an area of  km² and an elevation of  metres.

Demographics 

For the 2011 census, Barú had a population of  inhabitants.

Transportation

Road transportation 
The district is covered by the following road routes:
 National Route 243

References 

Districts of San José Province
Populated places in San José Province